Darian Christopher Duvalt (born December 12, 1987) is an American football wide receiver who is currently a free agent. He played college football at the University of Illinois at Urbana–Champaign and attended Lake Gibson High School in Lakeland, Florida. He has also been a member of the Seattle Seahawks, Orlando Predators, New Orleans VooDoo, Hamilton Tiger-Cats,
Philadelphia Soul and Florida Tarpons.

Early life
Duvalt attended Lake Gibson High School where he played football and basketball.

College career
On January 29, 2006, Duvalt committed to Illinois. Duvalt played for the Illinois Fighting Illini from 2006 to 2009. He was the team's starter his final year and a half and helped the Fighting Illini to 19 wins. He played in 42 games during his career including 15 starts at wide receiver. Duvalt started his career at Illinois as a defensive back, where he played 19 games primarily as a return specialist.

Statistics
Source:

Professional career

Seattle Seahawks
Duvalt signed as an undrafted free agent with the Seattle Seahawks in May 2010. About a week later, Duvalt was waived by the Seahawks.

Orlando Predators

On November 18, 2010, Duvalt was assigned to the Orlando Predators. Duvalt was active for the first 6 games of the season before being placed on injured reserve April 28, 2011. He was activated on June 29, 2011, just in time for the Predators playoff game where they lost to the Jacksonville Sharks.

New Orleans VooDoo
Duvalt was assigned to the New Orleans VooDoo on September 30, 2011. December 20, 2011, Duvalt was placed on the other league exempt list. On June 25, 2012, Duvalt was activated from the other league exempt list. Duvalt performed well in limited time with the VooDoo in 2012. Duvalt was assigned to the VooDoo again on October 26, 2012. Just 7 games into the 2013 season, Duvalt was placed on injured reserve after tearing his ACL, ending his season. Duvalt missed a majority of the 2014 season, recovering from the ACL injury, but he returned Week 18 in a VooDoo victory over the Sharks. Duvalt was assigned to the VooDoo again on March 10, 2015. Duvalt posted career highs with 109 receptions, 1,265 and 23 touchdowns.

Hamilton Tiger-Cats
On April 16, 2012, Duvalt was officially added to the Hamilton Tiger-Cats roster. Duvalt played in two preseason games with the Tiger-Cats, but was cut before the season began.

Philadelphia Soul
On November 13, 2015, Duvalt was assigned to the Philadelphia Soul. On August 26, 2016, the Soul beat the Arizona Rattlers in ArenaBowl XXIX by a score of 56–42. On August 26, 2017, the Soul beat the Tampa Bay Storm in ArenaBowl XXX by a score of 44–40.

Florida Tarpons
On March 6, 2018, Duvalt signed with the Florida Tarpons.

Washington Valor
On March 21, 2018, Duvalt was assigned to the Washington Valor.

References

External links
 Illinois Fighting Illini bio

Living people
1987 births
Players of American football from Florida
Sportspeople from Lakeland, Florida
American football wide receivers
Canadian football wide receivers
American players of Canadian football
Illinois Fighting Illini football players
Orlando Predators players
New Orleans VooDoo players
Hamilton Tiger-Cats players
Philadelphia Soul players
Florida Tarpons players
Washington Valor players
Seattle Seahawks players